Suhadi Reksowardojo (29 July 1923 – 26 July 1990) was an Indonesian academic. He also briefly served as State Minister of National Research in 1966.

Biography
Suhadi was born in Salatiga on 29 July 1923, and he studied chemical engineering during the Japanese occupation of Indonesia at the Bandung Kogyo Daigaku. He completed his initial diploma in 1948, when the school had moved to Yogyakarta due to the Indonesian National Revolution. During the revolution itself, Suhadi paused his studies, and took part in the nationalist cause, helping in the seizure of several production plants in West Java. After the war, he continued his studies at the University of Indonesia, obtaining his bachelor's degree in chemical engineering in 1957. He then began teaching chemical engineering there, before taking part in the founding of the Bandung Institute of Technology (ITB) in 1958.

He formulated the Tri Soko Guru in 1962, a set of principles for education which later evolved into the Tri Dharma Perguruan Tinggi, still used by present-day universities in Indonesia. In the Revised Dwikora Cabinet, Suhadi was appointed as State Minister of National Research, and he maintained his position in the succeeding cabinet. He then headed the National Research Body (Lemrenas). He was also professor of chemical engineering at ITB.

He died on 26 July 1990 in Yogyakarta.

References

1923 births
1990 deaths
Government ministers of Indonesia
University of Indonesia alumni
Bandung Institute of Technology alumni
Academic staff of Bandung Institute of Technology
Academic staff of the University of Indonesia
People from Salatiga